This is a list of electricity-generating power stations in the U.S. state of Massachusetts, sortable by type and name. In 2021, Massachusetts had a total summer capacity of 13,002 MW through all of its power plants, and a net generation of 18,214 GWh. The corresponding electrical energy generation mix in 2021 was 76.9% natural gas, 9.2% solar, 5.5% biomass, 4.2% hydroelectric, 4.8% non-biogenic waste, 1.1% wind, and 0.4% petroleum. The state's last remaining nuclear power plant was retired in May 2019. 

Massachusetts consumes about twice as much electricity as it generates, but is among the lowest electricity consumption states on a per capita basis, as well as on a per dollar of GDP basis. Distributed small-scale solar, including customer-owned photovoltaic panels, delivered an additional net 2,529 GWh to the state's electricity grid in 2021. This compares as about 50 percent more than the amount generated by Massachusetts' utility-scale solar facilities that year.

Active

Retired

See also 
 List of power stations in the United States

References

State Profile and Energy Estimates

Massachusetts
 
Power stations
Energy in Massachusetts